Nier is an action role-playing video game developed by Cavia and published by Square Enix in 2010. The music of Nier was composed by Keiichi Okabe with members of his studio, Monaca, Kakeru Ishihama and Keigo Hoashi, and Takafumi Nishimura of Cavia. The soundtrack has inspired the release of four official albums by Square Enix—an official soundtrack album and three albums of arrangements—along with two mini-albums included as pre-order bonuses for the Japanese versions of the game and two licensed EPs of jazz arrangements.

The original soundtrack was highly praised; reviewers noted it as one of the best video game soundtracks of the year, praising the originality of the compositions and the beauty of Emi Evans' vocal work. The first arranged album, while also warmly received, was perceived by critics to be weaker than the original and not long enough to stand up to the expectations created by the success of the original. The first three albums sold well enough to be recorded on the Japanese Oricon music charts, reaching number 24 for the original soundtrack, 59 for the first arranged album, and position number 77 for the second.

The soundtrack for Nier's sequel, Nier: Automata, was released worldwide on March 29, 2017. Returning collaborators include Keiichi Okabe and the Monaca team on composing duties and Emi Evans on vocals, along with several other singers and lyricists. Nier: Automata Original Soundtrack was highly reviewed by critics, and the album peaked at number 2 on the Oricon charts.

Development

Nier 
The soundtrack to Nier was composed by a collaboration of the studio Monaca, consisting of Keiichi Okabe, Kakeru Ishihama, and Keigo Hoashi, along with Takafumi Nishimura from Cavia, the game's developer. Okabe served as the lead composer and as the director for the project as a whole. Okabe was brought onto the project when the concept for the game was first being devised, and worked intermittently on the soundtrack for the next three years until its release. The music for the game was generally composed legal entirely separate from the development of the game. Often, elements of the game were modified to match the music, rather than the other way around. Some tracks were used in ways that the composers did not envision, such as "Grandma", which was expected to be used in the prologue of the game but was instead chosen as a boss battle theme. The music was designed for different motifs to appear in various arrangements throughout the soundtrack, and also to convey a sense of sadness even during the "thrilling" tracks. Okabe was allowed a great deal of freedom regarding what the music was to sound like; game director Taro Yoko's main request was that he use a lot of vocal works.

The vocals and lyrics were provided by vocalist Emi Evans (Emiko Rebecca Evans), a singer from England living in Tokyo. She is the singer for the band freesscape, and had previously worked on video game projects such as the Etrian Odyssey arrange albums. The Monaca team had met her when considering her for a prior project, and Okabe wanted to work with her on Nier. She was approached a few months after the initial meeting in Autumn 2008 to be the vocalist for the soundtrack. In addition to singing, Evans was asked to write her own lyrics in futuristic languages. The composers gave her preliminary version of songs and the style they wished the language to be in, such as Scottish Gaelic or French, and she invented the words. Evans wrote songs in versions of Scottish Gaelic, Portuguese, Spanish, Italian, French, English and Japanese, and wrote "Song of the Ancients" in an entirely fictional language. She wrote that song by listening to songs in as many languages as possible and jumbling them up together. For the other languages, she tried to imagine what they would sound like after 1000 years of drifting.

Okabe did not want to use traditional lyrics, as he felt they would clash with the design of the world in the game, and wanted to use a variety of languages to represent the open nature of the game's world. He also did not want easily recognizable lyrics to be sung in the background while the characters were speaking, and for any noticeable words to instead evoke emotions in the player. Evans only knew English, Japanese, and French when she began the project; she listened to the other languages on YouTube to learn the rhythms and sounds of the languages and then mixed and changed them. Okabe largely allowed Evans to decide how to integrate the lyrics with the early forms of the songs, and as he usually did not know where the songs would be used in the game gave her only light direction as to the emotional tone for the songs. The composers often would modify the songs in later revisions to follow how Evans had sung for that song.

Nier: Automata 
Composer Keiichi Okabe returned as lead composer with his studio band Monaca, alongside fellow members Keigo Hoashi, Kuniyuki Takahashi, and Kakeru Ishihama. The score was influenced by classical music, while recalling elements used for Nier such as the overall sense of melancholy. A change from the previous score was a shift to portraying a more mechanical and brutal theme and environment than Nier, which had focused on grasslands and villages. Another factor was the open world environment: rather than a single looping track, Okabe created multiple hard and soft tracks that transitioned into each other depending on situation and environment. Balancing of the music was carried out using the digital audio workstation (DAW) Pro Tools. Another prominent return was Emi Evans, who provided vocals for the first game's soundtrack. Additional male vocals were provided by Shotaro Seo. In addition, a theme song was created for the game, with versions sung by both Evans and new singer J'Nique Nicole. Nicole and Nami Nakagawa joined with Evans to form a three-part chorus for some of the musical work, including a boss theme featured in the game. Several songs from the Nier soundtrack were arranged for Nier: Automata.

The general sound design was handled by Masato Shindo, who was faced with a challenge new to the PlatinumGames staff: in their previous projects sound echoes had been handled by individual settings created by the team, but that would not work properly in an open world setting due to its scale. Instead, Shindo designed a realistic soundscape using a system to manage echoes in real time, determining how much reverberation to generate based on current surroundings. Sound implementation was handled by Masami Ueda, and it was a greater amount of work than he had experienced on any previous project. One of the factors that helped with the smooth implementation was Ueda's previous encounters and good working relationship with Okabe.

Releases

Nier

NieR Gestalt & Replicant Original Soundtrack

The soundtrack to Nier is largely composed of melancholy acoustic pieces which heavily feature vocals by Emi Evans. Of the 43 tracks included in the released soundtrack album, only 9 do not have any vocal component to them; these are the four versions each of "Dispossession" and "Yonah", as well as "Dance of the Evanescent". With the exception of "Ashes of Dreams", the lyrics are not intended to mean anything; for that song, Evans was given a list of Japanese words to use, which she then translated for the English, French, and Scottish Gaelic versions of the song. The song and its variants were the last to be recorded, and Evans convinced the composers that one song in the soundtrack should have recognizable lyrics rather than futuristic English as they originally planned. Evans found "Ashes" to be the most difficult song to write on the soundtrack, as she had difficulty writing lyrics that met the composers' criteria of despair and lack of hope.

"Hills of Radiant Wind" is one of the few upbeat songs on the largely dark soundtrack; for that piece Evans sang in a version of Portuguese in a style meant to sound like a spirit floating on the wind. For "Grandma", she sang in a French style, trying to "put in as much anguish and melancholy" as possible; she created the song in a single recording, and it is "one of the most memorable songs" that she has sung. "The Wretched Automatons" is sung in a variant of English and was recorded prior to the addition of the mechanical sounds that run throughout the track, while "Kainé" is in a version of Gaelic.

Square Enix released a soundtrack album of music from the game, titled NieR Gestalt & Replicant Original Soundtrack, on April 21, 2010. The two-disc, 2:30:09-long album has the catalog numbers of SQEX-10189/90. As preorder bonuses for Nier Gestalt and Nier Replicant, the two versions of the game released in Japan, two mini-albums, Nier Gestalt Mini Album and Nier Replicant Mini Album, were included. Each one contains five tracks from the full soundtrack album; Gestalt corresponds with tracks 1 and 4 from disc 1, 8 and 13 from disc 2, and an electronic version of "Kainé" titled "Kainé / Rain of Light", while Replicant encompasses track 3 from disc 2, tracks 2 and 7 from disc 1, track 1 from disc 2, and a medley of several tracks. Gestalt is 18:11 long, and Replicant 17:11. A book of sheet music of piano arrangements of tracks from the game by Okabe was published by KMP on April 22, 2011. The book, NieR Gestalt & Replicant Official Score Book, contains 25 arrangements in 112 pages. Guitar arrangements of "Song of the Ancients / Devola" and "Yonah / Strings Ver." by Yuji Sekiguchi were included in the Square Enix Official Best Collection guitar solo sheet music book, published by KMP in May 2011.

The soundtrack album reached number 24 on the Japanese Oricon music charts, and remained on the charts for 11 weeks. It was well received by critics; Patrick Gann of RPGFan called the album "an insanely good soundtrack" and noted it as his candidate for video game soundtrack of the year, as well as "one of the best game soundtracks ever". He applauded that the music was both "meticulously-crafted" and "accessible to the untrained ear". Don Kotowski of Square Enix Music Online praised the "captivating vocal work" and "exquisite" composition. He also noted that each track retained a sense of individuality even when it reused themes from other tracks. He was less complimentary towards the mini albums, which he regarded as good introductions to the soundtrack as a whole but not worth purchasing on their own. Jayson Napolitano of Original Sound Version also praised the album, saying that it was "hands down one of the best soundtracks Square Enix has published over the years". Calling it "captivating" and "otherworldly", he applauded the album's originality and Evans' vocals. Original Sound Version later named the soundtrack as the best video game soundtrack of 2010, and Square Enix Music Online awarded it the best Japanese video game soundtrack of the year.

Track list

NieR Gestalt & Replicant 15 Nightmares & Arrange Tracks

An album of arranged music was published by Square Enix on December 8, 2010. The album, NieR Gestalt & Replicant 15 Nightmares & Arrange Tracks, contains 11 tracks across a length of 54:43, and has a catalog number of SQEX-10212. The arrangements were done by composers Okabe, Ishihama, and Hoashi, as well as by "oriori", Ryuichi Takada, and Hidekazu Tanaka. The first five arrangements, in a techno style, were included in the Nier DLC, while the remaining tracks are piano, instrumental, chiptune, and a cappella versions of tracks from the game. In the liner notes for the album, Okabe said that the DLC tracks were meant to be "more war-like" versions of the originals, while the second half of the album was intended to "maintain the image and worldview of the original music".

The arranged album reached number 59 on the Oricon music charts, a position it held for a week. It was warmly received by reviewers, if less so than the first album; Patrick Gann critiqued the album as not being as good as the original, though he noted that "you can still be awesome and rank second to that album". He concluded that the arrangements were all of good quality, but that listeners would not be "blown away by it". Don Kotowski found it to be an "accomplished arrange album", but inferior to the original as he felt that it was shorter than it should have been and that the final two tracks were weaker than the rest of the arrangements. Jayson Napolitano also felt that the album should have been longer; he thought that most listeners would skip the DLC tracks in favor of the acoustic arrangements, and that six tracks was not enough to carry the album given the expectations created by the quality of the original soundtrack.

NieR tribute album -echo-

On September 14, 2011 Square Enix published a third Nier album, titled NieR Tribute Album -echo-. Each of the 12 tracks on the album is a remix of a Nier piece, each by a different artist. The resulting eclectic mix of styles is primarily electronic, but also includes a multiple-piano arrangement of "Grandma" and a klezmer rendition of "Shadowlord's Castle". The album has a duration of 1:00:46, and has the catalog number SQEX-10247.

The album reached number 77 on the Oricon music charts, a position it held for a week. It was positively reviewed by Jayson Napolitano of Original Sound Version, who described himself as "impressed" with it. He preferred this album to the arranged album, though he felt that a few of the tracks had difficulty distinguishing themselves above the high quality of the original pieces.

Piano Collections Nier Gestalt & Replicant

On March 21, 2012 Square Enix published a fourth Nier album, titled Piano Collections Nier Gestalt & Replicant. Each of the 11 tracks on the album is a piano arrangement of a Nier piece. The tracks were arranged and played by several different artists, namely Keigo Hoashi, Kumi Tanioka, Masato Kouda, Ryuichi Takada, and Yuri Misumi. Each arranger performed their own pieces, with the exception of Kouda, whose arrangement was played by Tanioka. The album has a duration of 45:42, and has the catalog number SQEX-10303.

The album was positively reviewed by Jayson Napolitano of Original Sound Version, who said that while "nothing on this album came as particularly surprising", that he enjoyed the arrangements and performances. He preferred the tracks on this album to the piano arrangements on the 15 Nightmares album.

NieR Gestalt & Replicant: Jazz Arrange version

Music from Nier has been arranged into two jazz EPs. The albums, titled NieR Gestalt & Replicant: Jazz Arrange Version and Jazz Arrange Version Vol. 2, contain six tracks each from the soundtrack licensed by Joypad Records. The tracks are arranged and performed by Sean Schafianski, and were released digitally on August 8, 2013, and May 16, 2014. The EPs have durations of 26:48 and 25:33. The music is split between instrumental and vocal pieces, and covers multiple different styles of jazz music.

The first EP was positively reviewed by Brad Hayes-Raugh of RPGFan, who "greatly enjoyed the direction this album takes", though he did note that some of the pieces did not quite meet his high expectations. He concluded that "the tracks give a fresh spin on some great pieces of video game music and keep the spirit of Nier alive and well."

Track list

NieR Replicant ver.1.22474487139...

An updated version of the game, NieR Replicant ver.1.22474487139..., was released in April 2021. Okabe, Ryuichi Takada, Keigo Hoashi, Kuniyuki Takahashi, Shotaro Seo, and Oliver Good of Monaca arranged the music under Okabe's direction, with a goal of making them longer and higher-quality than the originals rather than making them very different. The team wanted to give a "sense of renewal" with the pieces, and made sure not to change the "tone" of the songs, but added live instruments and choral elements. For example, in "Kainé / Salvation", more live instrumentation gave what they felt was a "richer sound", and where the original looped to start over the updated version instead repeats with slight changes and additions. A soundtrack album, NieR Replicant ver.1.22474487139... Original Soundtrack, was released alongside it on April 21, containing 45 tracks on three discs with a total length of 3:10:21. Some of the tracks were also included in the NieR Replicant – 10+1 Years set of four vinyl LPs, which has 29 tracks from NieR Replicant ver.1.22474487139... Original Soundtrack along with all other previous arranged and orchestral albums, as well as four new arrangements.

Weiss Edition
An album named NieR Replicant ver.1.22474487139... Soundtrack "Weiss Edition" is included in the collector version of the game, NieR Replicant ver.1.22474487139... White Snow Edition. It features a special soundtrack with newly-recorded and arranged music.

Nier: Automata

NieR: Automata Original Soundtrack

A sequel to Nier, Nier: Automata, was released in February 2017. Its music was again composed by Keiichi Okabe and the Monaca team, with Emi Evans, J'Nique Nicole, and Nami Nakagawa on vocals, Takanori Goto on guitar, and additional contributions by several artists. A soundtrack album for the game was released worldwide by Square Enix on March 29, 2017. The three-disc, 3:33:43-long album contains all of the music from the game, as well as, like the original game's album, variations on the main theme in multiple languages. Unlike the original Nier, where all of the versions were written and sung by Emi Evans and had the same lyrical meanings, the versions in Automata were written and sung by multiple people: the English version by J'Nique Nicole, one in an invented French-derived language by Evans, and the Japanese written by Yoko Taro and sung by Marina Kawano.

NieR: Automata Original Soundtrack peaked at number 2 on the Oricon charts, with over 28,000 copies sold in its first week in Japan. It was well received by critics; Patrick Gann of RPGFan said the album was as good or better than the original as well as "perfectly, wonderfully great".

Hacking tracks

On March 29, 2017, NieR: Automata Original Soundtrack HACKING TRACKS, a collection of chiptune 8-bit music consisted of 16 different tracks, was released. The tracks included in the album were used in hacking minigames of NieR: Automata. It was released as a pre-order bonus for the original soundtrack of NieR: Automata. The album was composed by Monaca team and arranged by Shotaro Seo of Monaca. The one-disc album has a duration of 46:07, and has the catalog number SQEX-10593.

The album was positively reviewed by Patrick Gann of RPGFan, who said that "NieR: Automata fans that got this album with their OSTs ought to count their blessings". Tien Hoang of VGMOnline believed that it is "a nice bonus album to have, but it isn’t essential".

NieR:Automata Arranged & Unreleased Tracks

On December 20, 2017, an album of arranged music and unreleased tracks of NieR: Automata was released by Square Enix in two discs. Disc one included arranged music by different artists, and unreleased tracks composed by Keiichi Okabe were included in disc two. The album consists of a total of 20 tracks, has a duration of 1:43:39, and has the catalog number SQEX-10631~2.

The album was praised by Patrick Gann of RPGFan, who believed that some tracks, such as "Weight of the World" and "Emil", were "very impressive".

NieR: Automata Piano Collections

NieR: Automata Piano Collections was published on April 25, 2018. The album contains 12 tracks across a length of 1:01:07 and has a catalog number of SQEX-10653. The tracks in the album are originally from NieR: Automata Original Soundtrack but transformed into piano renditions.

Patrick Gann of RPGFan said the album "is the weakest of the Automata albums Square Enix has released so far". Don Kotowski of VGMOnline believed the album is "by no means a bad album", but said "it is missing that spark".

Orchestral albums

On September 12, 2018, Square Enix released a pair of orchestral albums, NieR: Gestalt & NieR: Replicant Orchestral Arrangement Album and NieR: Automata Orchestral Arrangement Album. Each contains performances by the Kanagawa Philharmonic Orchestra of arrangements of music from each game, and were available individually or as a box set. NieR: Gestalt & NieR: Replicant Orchestral Arrangement Album contains 11 tracks, has a duration of 50:48 and the catalog number SQEX-10673. 10 tracks are included in NieR: Automata Orchestral Arrangement Album across a length of 49:37. The album has the catalog number SQEX-10674. The box set contains a further four tracks using different instrumental ensembles.

NieR: Gestalt & NieR: Replicant Orchestral Arrangement Album was reviewed positively by Tien Hoang of VGMOnline, who believed that it "is a solid addition" to the music catalog of NieR. Patrick Gann of RPGFan criticized NieR: Automata Orchestral Arrangement Album and believed that the choice of tracks included in the album could have been better. He called this album "disappointing". In his review of the box set, Hoang felt that the additional tracks were the most creative, and wished the other arrangements had followed suit.

Addendum
To correspond with the NieR Theatrical Orchestra 12020 concerts celebrating the 10th anniversary of the game series, Square Enix released another album of orchestral arrangements, NieR Orchestral Arrangement Album – Addendum, on March 25, 2020. It contains five tracks each from Gestalt & Replicant and Automata, arranged by Sachiko Miyano and Kosuke Yamashita and featuring solo vocal performances from Emi Evans and J’Nique Nicole. The first printing of the physical version of the album includes a bonus disc with three additional arrangements. The album was reviewd by Tien Hoang of VGMOnline, who found the tracks and performances solid but was disappointed that they stayed even more closely to the original pieces than the other orchestral albums, rather than having more creative arrangements, to the point of reusing some prior arrangements with minor differences.

Music videos
On July 15, 2015, an officially licensed arrangement of "Song of the Ancients" from Nier, along with a music video, were released by OverClocked Records. It was made available to stream or purchase. The song, a vocal performance with vibraphone and percussion, was the first officially licensed video game music single by the record label, an offshoot of the OverClocked ReMix video game music remix community. The single was sung by Jillian Aversa, who features in the accompanying music video, with percussion by Doug Perry. The song was performed by the duo prior to release at Video Games Live concerts, and was filmed at National Harbor, Maryland by the sculpture The Awakening in January 2015 during MAGFest, an annual game music convention.

Public performances
A concert in Tokyo, called "Nier Music Concert & Talk Live", was held at the Ex Theater Roppongi on April 16, 2016, with performances of various musical pieces from Nier and Nier: Automata. A Blu-ray of this performance was released on December 14, 2016.
A second concert was held on May 5, 2017 and was livestreamed via Niconico. The Addendum version of "Song of the Ancients" was played during the Parade of Nations of the 2020 Summer Olympics opening ceremony.

References

External links

MONACA official Website 

Drakengard
Video game soundtracks